Andorran Olympic Committee (Catalan: Comitè Olímpic Andorrà or COA) is the National Olympic Committee representing Andorra.

History
The Andorran Olympic Committee was created in 1971 and recognized by the IOC in 1975.

Member federations
The Andorran National Federations are the organizations that coordinate all aspects of their individual sports. They are responsible for training, competition and development of their sports. There are currently 20 Olympic Summer and 3 Winter Sport Federations and six Non-Olympic Sports Federations in Andorra.

Olympic Sport federations

Non-Olympic Sport federations

See also
Andorra at the Olympics

References

External links
 Official website

Andorra
Oly
Andorra at the Olympics
1971 establishments in Andorra
Sports organizations established in 1971